Anthony Jackie Tang (born 26 November 1998) is a Hong Kong tennis player.

Tang has a career high ATP singles ranking of 1178 achieved on 27 November 2017 and a career high ATP doubles ranking of 1265, also achieved on 27 November 2017.

Tang has represented Hong Kong at the Davis Cup, where he has a win–loss record of 2–2.

External links
 
 
 
 
 Anthony Jackie Tang at Columbia University

1998 births
Living people
Hong Kong male tennis players
Columbia Lions men's tennis players
Tennis players at the 2018 Asian Games
Asian Games competitors for Hong Kong